Texas Fever is a western novel by Donald Hamilton.

Plot summary
Three years after the Civil War, the McAuliffe family drives a herd of cattle north from Texas to Kansas and into another kind of war.

Publication history
 1960, US, Fawcett Publications, Gold Medal #1035, paperback, reissued several times
 1981, US, Walker, hardcover

External links
 Review by Bruce Grossman, Bookgasm

1960 American novels
Western (genre) novels
Novels by Donald Hamilton
Novels set in Texas
Novels set in Kansas
Fiction set in 1868
Gold Medal Books books